Mario Pelchat (born 1 February 1964) is a Canadian Francophone singer from Quebec. He received the Felix Award in 1990 and 1992.

Biography
Pelchat was born in Dolbeau-Mistassini, Quebec and has performed since 1973. His first 45 RPM single was released in September 1981. His early albums include 1982's Je suis un chanteur (I Am a Singer) and Tu m’as fait mal (You hurt me) the following year. His 1988 self-titled album and 1990's Couleur Passion (The Color of Passion) attained gold record sales status. His 1992 double-platinum album Pelchat on the Sony label included a duet with Céline Dion. He also recorded with Belgian singer Maurane on his Pelchat 2002 album.

Pelchat has performed in various theatrical productions. He played the title role in a 1998 musical on the artist Picasso during a European tour. He portrayed Quasimodo in a production of Notre Dame de Paris, Moses in a production of The Ten Commandments and Don Carlos in Don Juan.

He earned ADISQ's Félix Awards for Male Singer of The Year in 1990 and Album of the Year for 1992's Pelchat. He also earned a Jazz album Félix for the 2009 collaborative album Mario Pelchat-Michel Legrand. Besides touring in Canada, Pelchat has performed in Europe, the Middle East and the United States.

Discography

Studio albums

Live albums

Compilation albums

References

External links
  Mario Pelchat Official Website
  Quebec Info Musique: Mario Pelchat

1964 births
Living people
People from Dolbeau-Mistassini
Singers from Quebec
Canadian male singers
Canadian pop singers
French Quebecers
French-language singers of Canada